The Charles Lang Freer medal was established in 1956 by the Smithsonian Institution in honor of Charles Lang Freer, the founder of the Freer collection.  The medal is conferred intermittently, honoring distinguished career contributions made by scholars in the history of art.

Recipients
 First – Osvald Siren, February 15, 1956.
 Second – Ernst Kühnel, May 3, 1960.
 Third – Yashiro Yukio, September 15, 1965.
 Fourth – Tanaka Ichimatsu, May 2, 1973.
 Fifth – Laurence Sickman, September 11, 1973.
 Sixth – Roman Ghirshman, January 16, 1974.
 Seventh – Max Loehr, May 2, 1983.
 Eighth – Stella Kramrisch, 1985.
 Ninth – Alexander Coburn Soper III, 1990.
 Tenth – Sherman Lee, 1998.
 Eleventh – Oleg Grabar, 2001.
Twelfth – James F. Cahill, 2010.
Thirteenth – John M. Rosenfield, 2012.
Fourteenth – Jessica Rawson, 2017.
Fifteenth – Vidya Deheija, April 28, 2023. 
Sixteenth – Gülru Necipoğlu, October 27, 2023.

Notes

References
 Soper, Alexander. (1990).  A Case of Meaningful Magic.  Washington, D.C.: Smithsonian Institution.
 Freer Gallery of Art. (1960).  The Charles Lang Freer medal, February 25, 1956. Washington, D.C.: Smithsonian Institution.
 __. (1973).  Fifth presentation of the Charles Lang Freer medal, September 11, 1973. Washington, D.C.: Smithsonian Institution.
 __. (1956). First presentation of the Charles Lang Freer medal, February 25, 1956. Washington, D.C.: Smithsonian Institution.
 __. (1973).  Fourth presentation of the Charles Lang Freer Medal, May 2, 1973. Washington, D.C.: Smithsonian Institution.
 __. (1960).  Second presentation of the Charles Lang Freer medal, May 3, 1960. Washington, D.C.: Smithsonian Institution.
 __. (1983). Seventh presentation of the Charles Lang Freer Medal, May 2, 1983. Washington, D.C.: Smithsonian Institution.
 __. (1974).  Sixth presentation of the Charles Lang Freer medal, January 16, 1974.  Washington, D.C.: Smithsonian Institution.
 __. (1998).  Tenth Presentation of the Charles Lang Freer Medal, Sherman E. Lee. Washington, D.C.: Smithsonian Institution.
 __. (1965). Third presentation of the Charles Lang Freer medal, September 15, 1965. Washington, D.C.: Smithsonian Institution.
 Roades, Katharine N. (1960).  "An Appreciation of Charles Lang Freer (1859-1919)," Ars Orientalis. Vol. 2.

External links
 Smithsonian:  Freer medal, obverse image;  reverse image

Arts awards in the United States
Awards established in 1956
Smithsonian Institution
1956 establishments in the United States